Abrahim Yango (born 6 August 1996) is a Liberian-born Australian footballer who plays as a winger for Eastern Suburbs in the National Premier Leagues Queensland.

Club career
Yango started his career with A-League side Brisbane Roar.
He made his senior debut on 18 April 2015 against Melbourne Victory FC.

Yango signed with Avondale FC in February 2016 ahead of the NPL Victoria season.

References

External links

1996 births
Living people
Association football midfielders
Australian soccer players
Brisbane Roar FC players
Avondale FC players
A-League Men players
National Premier Leagues players